Fernando Pedroza is a municipality in the Brazilian state of Rio Grande do Norte.

References 

Municipalities in Rio Grande do Norte